Morgan White may refer to:

Morgan White (radio DJ) (1924–2010), American radio disc jockey and TV actor
Morgan White (gymnast) (born 1983), American gymnast